Asteromyrtus is a genus of flowering plants in the Myrtaceae family. It is closely related to Callistemon and Melaleuca.

History
Asteromyrtus was described as a genus in 1843. The genus was subsequently subsumed into Melaleuca and Sinoga, but was reinstated by Lyndley Craven in 1988 to accommodate seven species, all of which are tropical shrubs or small trees native to New Guinea, Maluku, or northern Australia, in lands peripheral to the Arafura Sea, Gulf of Carpentaria and Torres Strait.

Species

 Asteromyrtus angustifolia (Gaertn.) Craven - n Queensland
 Asteromyrtus arnhemica (Byrnes) Craven - n Northern Territory, n Western Australia
 Asteromyrtus brassii (Byrnes) Craven - s New Guinea, n Queensland
 Asteromyrtus lysicephala (F.Muell. & F.M.Bailey) Craven - Aru Islands, s New Guinea, n Queensland
 Asteromyrtus magnifica (Specht) Craven - n Northern Territory, Groote Eylandt
 Asteromyrtus symphyocarpa (F.Muell.) Craven – Liniment Tree - s New Guinea, n Queensland, n Northern Territory
 Asteromyrtus tranganensis Craven - Aru Islands

References

Myrtaceae genera
 
Australasian realm flora